The Fares Al-Khoury government was the Fifty third in the modern Syrian History, the thirty third in the first Syrian republic , the tenth during the second term of president Hashim Al-Atassi and the Fourth for Fares al-Khoury.it was formed on October 29, 1954 and dissolved February 13, 1955.

Cabinet

See also
Cabinet of Syria
Government ministries of Syria
List of prime ministers of Syria
Ministry of Defense (Syria)
List of foreign ministers of Syria

References 

Governments of Syria
Government ministers of Syria
1954 establishments in Syria
Cabinets established in 1954
Cabinets disestablished in 1955